Pauline Felix House is a historic home located at Long Beach in Nassau County, New York. It was built in 1909 and is a -story, Italian Renaissance–style residence with a stucco exterior and a clay tile hipped roof.  It features a portico supported by six evenly spaced square posts and running the full width of the facade.

It was listed on the National Register of Historic Places in 2005.

References

Houses on the National Register of Historic Places in New York (state)
Renaissance Revival architecture in New York (state)
Houses completed in 1909
Houses in Nassau County, New York
National Register of Historic Places in Hempstead (town), New York